The Dry Creek Rancheria is the land base ( reservation ) of the Dry Creek Rancheria Band of Pomo Indians. It is situated about 3 miles southeast of Geyserville.

The tribe itself was called Dry Creek Rancheria from the time of Vallejo (Spanish Rancherías) in the 19th century.  In 1915 the tribe was called "Dry Creek Indians", "Dry Creek Pomo", and many mixtures of the two.  The tribe adopted the name "Dry Creek Rancheria" for the reservation (lands) and the tribe officially in 1972.  The tribe changed its name to Dry Creek Rancheria Band of Pomo Indians.

External links
Tribal webpage

Geography of Sonoma County, California